The Mayor of Chatham Islands is the head of the local government of the Chatham Islands, New Zealand, and presides over the Chatham Islands Council.

Patrick Smith served as mayor of the Chatham Islands from 1992 until his retirement in 2010.

Smith was succeeded by deputy mayor Alfred Preece, who acted as mayor until he was elected to the position in 2010. Preece had initially been invited to run for council by Mayor Smith. He is the son of Alfred "Bunty" Preece QSO, a former chairman of the Chatham Islands County Council.

Monique Croon is the current mayor of the Chatham Islands. She was first elected in the 2019 local elections.

List of mayors

List of deputy mayors

Mayoral elections 
Mayoral elections take place in the Chatham Islands every 3 years, as part of the wider local elections in New Zealand. Under section 10 of the Local Electoral Act 2001, a "general election of members of every local authority or community board must be held on the second Saturday in October in every third year" from the date the Act came into effect in 2001.

2001 Chatham Islands mayoral election 
This was the first election held following the Local Electoral Act 2001. Patrick Smith won re-election, retaining the mayoralty.

2004 Chatham Islands mayoral election 
This election was held using the single transferable vote (STV) system.

Once again, Patrick Smith won re-election.

2007 Chatham Islands mayoral election 
The Chatham Islands retained the STV system used in the prior election. Patrick Smith won re-election.

2010 Chatham Islands mayoral election 
For this election, the Chatham Islands Council abolished STV and adopted first-past-the-post voting.

On 31 January 2010, Patrick Smith resigned from the mayoralty, and was immediately succeeded as acting mayor by his deputy, Alfred Preece. Preece ran for the 2010 election and retained the mayoralty on 9 October, defeating challenger Joseph Tapara.

2013 Chatham Islands mayoral election 
Tapara unsuccessfully tried to oust Preece a second time in October 2013, only to be defeated by an even wider margin.

2016 Chatham Islands mayoral election 
Preece won re-election.

2019 Chatham Islands mayoral election 
Alfred Preece did not run for the 2019 mayoral election, allowing Monique Croon to take the mayoralty.

2022 Chatham Islands mayoral election 
Croon successfully ran for re-election. Although the election was officially non-partisan, it was analysed within the wider context of polarized public opinion regarding the Sixth Labour Government's Three Waters reform programme. Croon was one of three elected mayors to strongly support Three Waters (in contrast, 6 mayors gave it soft support, 14 were on the fence, 30 gave it soft opposition and 13 gave it strong opposition). After her election victory, Croon gave an interview on Te Ao Māori News.

References

Chatham Islands
Politics of Canterbury, New Zealand
Chatham Islands